Neil T Anderson is an evangelical best-selling author on spiritual freedom including 'Victory Over the Darkness','The Bondage Breaker', 'The Steps to Freedom in Christ' and 'Daily in Christ'. He is founder and president emeritus of Freedom in Christ Ministries. He was formerly chairman of the Practical Theology Department at Talbot School of Theology.

Dr. Anderson's legacy continues worldwide and throughout America as FICM-USA has developed CFMU, an online training program.

Early life
Neil Anderson was born on a farm in Minnesota to Scandinavian parents. After high school he joined the Navy and received training as an electronics technician and also worked as a sea and rescue swimmer. After being discharged honorably from the Navy he entered engineering school. After graduation, he took up a job as an aerospace engineer. He found the Lord while attending a Lay Institute For Evangelism by Campus Crusade for Christ. Two years after coming to the Lord he resigned his position at Honeywell and enrolled at Talbot School of Theology, the graduate school of Biola University.

Books
List of books authored by Neil T Anderson.

 A Way of Escape: Freedom from Sexual Strongholds by Neil T. Anderson (Jan 1, 1998)
 Awesome God: Getting to Know Him by Neil T. Anderson, Rich Miller (1996)
 Becoming a Disciple-Making Church: A Proven Method for Growing Spiritually Mature Christians by Neil T. Anderson (January 26, 2016)
 Blessed Are the Peacemakers: Finding Peace with God, Yourself and Others by Neil T. Anderson (July 2002)
 Bondage Breaker You: Study Guide by Neil T. Anderson
 Breaking Strongholds in Your City: How to Use Spiritual Mapping to Make Your Prayers More Strategic, Effective and Targeted by Neil T. Anderson
 Breaking the Bondage of Legalism by Neil T. Anderson, Rich Miller, and Paul Travis (Jul 1, 2003)
 Breaking Through to Spiritual Maturity by Neil T. Anderson
 Busting Free: Helping Youth Discover Their True Identity in Christ by Neil T. Anderson, Dave Park
 Christ-Centered Therapy by Neil T. Anderson, Terry E. Zuehlke, Julianne S. Zuehlke, and Dr. Terry Zuehlke, Dr. Neil Anderson (Aug 1, 2000)
 Daily in Christ by Neil T. Anderson and Joanne Anderson (Jan 1, 1993)
 Discipleship Counseling by Neil T. Anderson (Aug 20, 2003)
 Experiencing Christ Together: Finding Freedom and Fulfillment in Marriage by Neil T. Anderson and Dr. Charles Mylander (Oct 1, 2009)
 Extreme Church Makeover by Neil T. Anderson and Dr. Charles Mylander (Sep 13, 2005)
 Extreme Faith by Neil T. Anderson
 Finding Freedom in a Sex-Obsessed World by Neil T. Anderson
 Finding God's Will in Spiritually Deceptive Times by Neil T. Anderson
 Finding Hope Again by Neil T. Anderson and Hal Baumchen (1999)
 Free: Connecting With Jesus. The Source of True Freedom by Neil T. Anderson, Dave Park
 Free to Be Yourself by Neil T. Anderson, Steve Goss
 Freedom from Addiction by Neil T. Anderson, Mike Quarles, Julia Quarles, and Terry Whalin (Jun 17, 1996)
 Freedom from Addiction Workbook: Breaking the Bondage of Addiction and Finding Freedom in Christ by Neil T. Anderson, Mike Quarles, Julia Quarles
 Freedom from Depression by Neil T. Anderson
 Freedom from Fear: Overcoming Worry and Anxiety by Neil T. Anderson and Rich Miller (Jul 1, 1999)
 Freedom in Christ by Neil T. Anderson, Steve Goss
 Freedom in Christ: Age 11-14 Pack of Five Workbooks by Neil T. Anderson
 Freedom in Christ: Age 15-18 workbook by Neil T. Anderson
 Freedom In Christ Bible: A One Year Study Of God's Liberating Truth by Neil T. Anderson
 Freedom in Christ Bible Study Leader's Guide by Neil T. Anderson (Aug 1, 2008)
 Freedom in Christ: Discipleship Course-Leaders Guide by Neil T. Anderson
 Freedom in Christ for Young People: Leader's Guide: Full Text with DVDs by Neil T. Anderson
 Freedom in Christ Leader's Guide: A Life-Changing Discipleship Program by Neil T. Anderson
 Freedom in Christ Student Guide: A Life-Changing Discipleship Program by Neil T. Anderson
 Freedom In Christ: Workbook: A 13 Week Course For Every Christian (Group Workbook) by Neil T. Anderson
 Freedom in Christ Youth Edition, Ages 15-18, Packs of Five by Neil T. Anderson
 Getting Anger Under Control: Overcoming Unresolved Resentment, Overwhelming Emotions, and the Lies Behind Anger by Neil T. Anderson and Rich Miller (Jan 15, 2002)
 God's Power at Work in You by Neil T. Anderson and Robert L. Saucy (Jul 1, 2001)
 God's Story for You: Discover the Person God Created You to Be by Neil T. Anderson
 Grace That Breaks the Chains: Freedom from Guilt, Shame, and Trying Too Hard by Neil T. Anderson, Rich Miller, Paul Travis
 Growing in Christ: Deepen Your Relationship with Jesus by Neil T. Anderson
 Helping Other Find Freedom in Christ by Neil T. Anderson
 Helping Others Find Freedom in Christ: Training Manual and Study Guide by Neil T. Anderson, Tom C. McGee
 Higher Ground: Taking Faith To The Edge! by Neil T. Anderson, Robert Saucy, Dave Park
 Innovation and Change in Organizations by Nigel King, Neil T. Anderson
 Innovation And Knowledge Management by Neil T. Anderson (Editor), Ana Cristina Costa
 Know Light, No Fear: Understanding Your Faith and God's Will for Your Life by Neil T. Anderson, Rich Miller
 Leading Teens To Freedom In Christ by Neil T. Anderson, Rich Miller
 Liberating Prayer by Neil T. Anderson
 Living Free in Christ by Neil T. Anderson (Jun 1993)
 Marriage, Family and Christian Counseling Reference Library by Neil T. Anderson, H. Norman Wright
 Ministering the Steps to Freedom by Neil T. Anderson
 NIV Freedom in Christ Bible Devotionals by Neil T. Anderson
 One Day at a Time: The Devotional for Overcomers by Neil T. Anderson, Mike Quarles, Julia Quarles
 Overcoming Addictive Behavior: The Victory Over the Darkness Series by Neil T. Anderson and Mike Quarles (Oct 8, 2003)
 Overcoming Depression (Victory Over the Darkness) by Neil T. Anderson and Joanne Anderson (Jul 2, 2004)
 Overcoming Doubt (Victory Over the Darkness) by Neil T. Anderson (Mar 2004)
 Overcoming Negative Self-Image (The Victory Over the Darkness Series) by Neil T. Anderson and Dr. Dave Park (Jul 2, 2003)
 Praying by the Power of the Spirit (The Bondage Breaker® Series) by Neil T. Anderson (Jul 1, 2003)
 Purity Under Pressure by Neil T. Anderson, David Park
 Radical Image! by Neil T. Anderson, David Park, Robert L. Saucy
 Real Life: You Want It-Go for It! by Neil T. Anderson, David Park
 Reality Check by Neil T. Anderson, Rich Miller
 Released from Bondage by Neil T. Anderson
 Renewing Your Mind: Become More Like Christ (Study 4) by Neil T. Anderson
 Restored by Neil T. Anderson (Jan 15, 2008)
 Restoring Broken Relationships: The Path to Peace and Forgiveness by Neil T. Anderson (November 3, 2015)
 Rivers of Revival: How God is Moving & Pouring Himself Out on His People Today by Neil T. Anderson
 Rough Road to Freedom: A Memoir by Neil T. Anderson
 Seduction of Our Children by Neil T. Anderson, Steve Russo
 Set Free by Neil T. Anderson
 Setting Your Church Free by Neil T. Anderson, Charles Mylander
 Setting Your Church Free Conference Workbook by Neil T. Anderson, Charles Mylander
 Setting Your Marriage Free: Discover and Enjoy Your Freedom in Christ Together by Neil T. Anderson (Preface), Charles Mylander
 Sold Out for God: Becoming More Like Jesus by Neil T. Anderson, Robert L. Saucy, Dave Park v
 Spiritual Protection for Your Children: Helping Your Children and Family Find Their Identity, Freedom and Security in Christ by Neil T. Anderson, Sue Vander Hook
 Steps to Freedom in Christ: A Step-By-Step Guide To Help You by Neil T. Anderson (May 10, 2004)
 Steps To Freedom In Christ: Workbook by Neil T. Anderson
 Stomping Out Depression by Neil T. Anderson, David Park, Dave Park
 Stomping Out Fear by Neil T. Anderson, Rich Miller, David Park
 Stomping Out the Darkness: Discover Your True Identity in Christ and Stop Putting Up with the World's Garbage by Neil T. Anderson and Dr. Dave Park (Jun 2, 2008)
 The Beginner's Guide to Spiritual Warfare by Neil T. Anderson and Timothy M. Warner (Nov 3, 2008)
 The Biblical Guide to Alternative Medicine by Neil T. Anderson, Michael Jacobson
 The Bondage Breaker by Neil T. Anderson
 The Bondage Breaker Interactive Workbook by Neil T. Anderson
 The Bondage Breaker Study Guide by Neil T. Anderson
 The Bondage Breaker: The Next Step by Neil T. Anderson
 The Bondage Breaker Youth Edition by Neil T. Anderson, Dave Park
 The Christ-Centered Marriage: Discovering and Enjoying Your Freedom in Christ Together by Neil T. Anderson, Charles Mylander
 The Common Made Holy by Neil T. Anderson, Robert L. Saucy
 The Common Made Holy Study Guide by Neil T. Anderson, Robert L. Saucy
 The Core of Christianity: Rediscovering Authentic Unity and Personal Wholeness in Christ by Neil T. Anderson (Jan 15, 2010)
 The Daily Discipler by Neil T. Anderson (May 3, 2005)
 The Essential Guide to Spiritual Warfare: Learn to Use Spiritual Weapons; Keep Your Mind and Heart Strong in Christ; Recognize Satan's Lies and Defend Your Loved Ones by Neil T. Anderson (Preface), Timothy M Warner
 The Freedom In Christ: Discipleship Group Workbook by Neil T. Anderson, Steve Goss
 The Path to Reconciliation: Connecting People to God and To Each Other by Neil T. Anderson (Apr 1, 2008)
 The Power of Presence: A love story by Neil T. Anderson
 Unleashing God's Power in You by Neil T. Anderson, Robert L. Saucy
 Victory Over the Darkness by Neil T. Anderson (Dec 6, 2010)
 Walking in Freedom: A 21 Day Devotional To Help Establish Your Freedom In Christ by Neil T. Anderson and Rich Miller (Jan 2, 2009)
 Victory Over the Darkness Study Guide by Neil T. Anderson
 Walking in the Light by Neil T. Anderson
 Walking Through the Darkness: Discerning Gods Guidance in the New Age by Neil T. Anderson
 What God Says about Me: Helping Kids Discover That They Are Accepted Safe and Important in Jesus Christ by Neil T. Anderson
 Who I Am In Christ by Neil T. Anderson (Oct 8, 2001)
 Winning the Battle Within: Realistic Steps to Overcoming Sexual Strongholds by Neil T. Anderson (Jul 1, 2008)
 Your Authority in Christ: Overcome Strongholds in Your Life by Neil T. Anderson
 Your Foundation in Christ: Live By the Power of the Spirit (Study 3) by Neil T. Anderson
 Your Life in Christ: Walk in Freedom by Faith by Neil T. Anderson
 Your New Identity: A Transforming Union with God by Neil T. Anderson
 Your Ultimate Victory: Stand Strong in the Faith by Neil T. Anderson

References

20th-century births
Year of birth missing (living people)
Living people
Writers from Minnesota
Biola University alumni
Place of birth missing (living people)